"Till I Loved You" is a song from the never-staged musical Goya: A Life in Song, based on the life of the Spanish artist Francisco Goya. It was written by American composer Maury Yeston.

The original was sung by tenor Plácido Domingo and American singer Dionne Warwick. It was subsequently released as a single by Domingo with another collaborator to the album, Jennifer Rush. The song reached number 24 on the UK Charts in 1989, and was featured on the concept album of the musical.

It was covered (although released first) as a duet by Barbra Streisand and Don Johnson, and appeared on Streisand's Platinum-selling 1988 album of the same name, and later on her 2002 compilation, Duets. As a single, it reached number 16 in the United Kingdom, number 25 in the United States and number 22 on the Spain Top 40 Radio chart.  It also reached number 3 on Billboard's Adult Contemporary survey.

Domingo also recorded a Spanish-language single of the song with Gloria Estefan titled "Hasta amarte" and a Portuguese version, "Apaixonou", with Simone Bittencourt de Oliveira. "Hasta amarte" peaked at number 8 on Billboard's Hot Latin Songs chart.

Charts

References

1988 songs
1988 singles
1989 singles
Barbra Streisand songs
Plácido Domingo songs
Jennifer Rush songs
Gloria Estefan songs